Robert John Toski, born Algustoski (born September 18, 1926), is an American professional golfer and golf instructor. He was inducted into the PGA Golf Professional Hall of Fame in 2013.

Early years
He was born in Haydenville, Massachusetts of Polish descent, the eighth of nine children born to Walenty Algustoski and his wife Mary. He learned to play golf at Northampton Country Club, where he caddied and where two of his elder brothers, Jack and Ben, were assistant professionals.

PGA Tour
He joined the PGA Tour in 1949 and broke through for his first win in the Insurance City Open in 1953. He was the leading money winner in 1954, when his four victories included the World Championship of Golf, where first prize was $50,000, by far the richest prize-money golf event in the world. That victory also earned him a $50,000 contract from promoter George S. May to put on 50 exhibitions the following year; he would put on 57 and play in only 14 events in 1955. He scaled back his playing career starting in 1957 after wife Lynn gave birth to three boys in a span of less than four years.

Toski found stardom on the Tour despite weighing only 118 pounds. He was the smallest Tour player throughout his playing career and his combination of his small size and his driving prowess earned him the nickname "Mouse" from Sam Snead, a reference to the cartoon superhero Mighty Mouse popular at that time.

Club professional, coach, author, broadcaster
Toski left the tour aged 30 so he could spend more time with his young family (perhaps influenced by having lost his own mother at age six), and took a series of jobs as a club professional, while still competing occasionally on the Tour.

Later he found renewed fame as a leading golf coach, assisting tour pros such as World Golf Hall of Fame inductees Tom Kite and Judy Rankin as well as Australian star Bruce Crampton. He also wrote several golf instructional books, and made some of the earliest golf instruction videos. In the early 1980s he was a regular on NBC Sports golf telecasts. He worked as color commentator with Hughes Sports Network golf telecasts in the 1970s.

Senior PGA Tour
Toski began playing on the Senior PGA Tour (now Champions Tour) upon its formation in 1980. He left the Tour in January 1986 after he became involved in a controversy over how he marked his ball in a tournament in Japan. Fellow Senior PGA Tour player Gay Brewer stated that Toski improved his lie by marking it away from a spike mark near where his ball had come to rest on the green. Toski said that he had no recollection of any rules infraction. He returned in April 1986 and played several more years on the Tour.

Legacy
He was the first living instructor inducted into the World Golf Teachers Hall of Fame, and he is also a member of the National Polish-American Hall of Fame.

Professional wins (12)

PGA Tour wins (5)
1953 (1) Insurance City Open
1954 (4) Baton Rouge Open, Azalea Open, Eastern Open, World Championship of Golf

Other wins (5)
this list is probably incomplete
1953 Havana Invitational
1958 Massachusetts Open, Jamaica Open, Puerto Rico Open
1959 Maine Open

Other senior wins (2)
1990 Liberty Mutual Legends of Golf - Legendary Division (with Mike Fetchick)
1992 Liberty Mutual Legends of Golf - Legendary Division (with Mike Fetchick)

Playoff record
Senior PGA Tour playoff record (0–1)

Results in major championships

Note: Toski never played in The Open Championship.

CUT = missed the half-way cut
"T" indicates a tie for a place
R128, R64, R32, R16, QF, SF = round in which player lost in PGA Championship match play

Major works

  

Find Your Own Fundamentals (with Jim Flick), Golf Digest, 1992

References

External links

GolfOnline bio and guide to Toski's coaching theory
Toski Golf - golf equipment company
Toski-Battersby Golf Learning Center - Toski's golf school in Florida

American male golfers
PGA Tour golfers
PGA Tour Champions golfers
American golf instructors
Golf writers and broadcasters
Golfers from Massachusetts
American people of Polish descent
People from Williamsburg, Massachusetts
1926 births
Living people